Kevin Dooney (born 7 July 1993) is an Irish long-distance runner.

He competed in the men's half marathon at the 2018 IAAF World Half Marathon Championships held in Valencia, Spain. He finished in 135th place. In 2019, he competed in the senior men's race at the 2019 IAAF World Cross Country Championships held in Aarhus, Denmark. He finished in 105th place.

His father Roy was an Irish cross country and marathon runner, who finished second in the 1991 Chicago Marathon.

References

External links 
 

Living people
1993 births
Place of birth missing (living people)
Irish male long-distance runners
Irish male cross country runners